Hero is a 2012 Indian Malayalam-language masala film directed by Diphan and written by Vinod Guruvaayur. It stars Prithviraj Sukumaran, Srikanth, Yami Gautam, Anoop Menon, Kottayam Nazir, Bala, Nandhu and Thalaivasal Vijay in lead roles. The film is produced by G.P. Vijayakumar. The soundtrack is scored by Gopi Sundar along with lyrics by Anil Panachooran.

Plot 
Dharmarajan is a famous action choreographer who worked in many films and runs a combat academy for interested students. He was out from the film industry for a long time. Dharmarajan needs some money for his daughter's marriage. So he visits one of his old students Aadhityan, who has become one of the top directors in the Malayalam film industry. 

Aadhityan gives a chance to Dharmarajan. Dharmarajan seeks help from his several students to assist him with the job, but no one helps him. Dharmarajan visits his favourite student "Tarzan" Antony, who left him due of some personal issues. Antony agrees and joins the film set where he meets Premanand and Gowri Menon, one of the top actors in the film industry. Premanand, who is also the son of Home Minister, is depressed about his earlier flop films and needs his next film to be a hit at the box office. So, he collaborates with his friend Aadhityan for the film. 

Meanwhile, Premanand likes Gowri and wants to propose her. He tries to impress her in several ways. But she feigns ignorance because of Premanand's laziness, self praising and arrogance. Antony's dedication to his works and amazing fight choreography impresses Gowri. The film is released and becomes a hit. The audience (who don't know the actual hero behind the screen) appreciates Premanand for the action sequences while Gowri, Aadhityan and the whole crew appreciates Antony for his work. Gowri and Antony fall in love with each other. Premanand decides to destroy Antony, who is a hindrance between him and Gowri. At that time, Aadhityan announces his next project with the same cast and crew. 

Premanand wants to remove Antony from the project but Aadhityan, in turn removes Premanand from the film and appoints Antony for the film's lead role. Enraged, Premanand plots to kill Antony, but ends up killing Antony's father Thankachan. Aadhityan tells Antony to leave the matters for a while. Once the filming for the film gets over and is released, Antony arrives at Premanand's hideout and defeats Premanand and Gowri's brother, thus avenging his father's death. Later, Antony is accepted as the new Hero of the film industry by the audience and the film is declared as a blockbuster at the box office. Antony and Gowri are more than happy to openly accept their proposal.

Cast 

 Prithviraj Sukumaran as "Tarzan" Antony
 Srikanth as Premanand (voiceover by Mithun Ramesh)
 Yami Gautam as Gowri Menon (voiceover by Vimmi Mariyam George)
Anoop Menon as Aadithyan
 Thalaivasal Vijay as Dharmarajan Master (voiceover by Shobi Thilakan)

 Nedumudi Venu as Thankachan, Antony's father
 Bala as Udayanand
 Tini Tom as Suni
 Anil Murali as Hakkim Bhai
 Kottayam Nazeer as Bhasha
 Chalil Baby as A.C.P. Thomas Alex
 Nandhu Krishnamurthy as Sathyan
 Sudheer Karamana as Muthu
 Dinesh Panicker as Premanand's father
 Sadiq Muhammed as C.I. Honey Das
 Jaffar Idukki as Murugan Desentmukku
 Arun Cherukavil as Goutham Menon
 Indrans as Pallan
 K. P. A. C. Lalitha as Mary Thankachan Antony's mother 
 Malavika Menon as Annie Thankachan
 Rosin Jolly
 Sarayu Mohan 
 Kiran Raj as eldho
 Alwyn Fernandus

Music 

The soundtrack of the film was composed by Gopi Sunder. The soundtrack album was launched on 13 May 2012 at People's Plaza in Cochin.

Release
The film was released on 25 May 2012 worldwide and received mixed reviews from critics and audiences, where it moderately performed at the box office.

References

External links
 

2012 films
2010s Malayalam-language films
2010s comedy thriller films
2010s action comedy-drama films
Indian comedy thriller films
Indian action comedy-drama films
Films scored by Gopi Sundar
Films directed by Diphan